Fort Zumwalt East High School, also known as FZE, is the fourth high school in the Fort Zumwalt School District, and is located in Saint Peters, Missouri, United States.

The school first opened to freshman and sophomore students on August 20, 2007. Encompassing  formerly known as Koenig's Farm, the five-story property was built with funds from a no-tax increase bond issue.

References

External links
 Fort Zumwalt East High School
 Fort Zumwalt East Football
 Fort Zumwalt East Baseball
 Fort Zumwalt East Soccer
 Fort Zumwalt East Choir
 Student Data Management System
 Fort Zumwalt East Activities Calendar

High schools in St. Charles County, Missouri
Educational institutions established in 2007
Public high schools in Missouri
St. Peters, Missouri
2007 establishments in Missouri